The Salmon Falls River is a tributary of the Piscataqua River in the U.S. states of Maine and New Hampshire.

The Salmon Falls River joins the Cochecho River near Dover, New Hampshire, to form the Piscataqua River.

It provides hydroelectric power at the New Hampshire towns of Milton, North Rochester, East Rochester, New Hampshire, Somersworth, and Rollinsford, and in Maine at Berwick and South Berwick. The final three miles of the river, from South Berwick to the Piscataqua, are tidal.

Local Abenaki Indians called the river Newichawannock (New-ik-a-WAN-nok), meaning "river with many falls". See Newichawannock Canal

See also

List of rivers of Maine
List of rivers of New Hampshire

External links

 History of the Newichawannock – Salmon Falls River

References

Rivers of York County, Maine
Borders of New Hampshire
Borders of Maine
Berwick, Maine
South Berwick, Maine
Rivers of Strafford County, New Hampshire
Rivers of Maine
Rivers of New Hampshire